Grant W. Marshall (born June 9, 1973) is a Canadian former ice hockey right winger who currently works on behalf of the Devils Alumni Association.  He played for the Dallas Stars, Columbus Blue Jackets and New Jersey Devils of the NHL. He last played for the Devils' minor league affiliate, the Lowell Devils, during the 2007-08 season.

Career
Born in Port Credit, Ontario, Marshall was drafted 23rd overall by the Toronto Maple Leafs in the 1992 NHL Entry Draft. Marshall has played 700 career NHL games, scoring 92 goals and 147 assists for 239 points. His name was engraved on the Stanley Cup with the Dallas Stars in 1999 as well as with the New Jersey Devils in 2003.  He scored the series-clinching goal in game five of the Eastern Conference Semi-Finals against the Tampa Bay Lightning in triple overtime.  He also assisted on Jeff Friesen's series clinching goal in the Eastern Conference Final.

On December 4, 1990, Marshall was checked from behind into the boards in a game vs. the Sudbury Wolves. He suffered temporary paralysis but made a full recovery, and was able make it to the NHL roster.

On September 8, 2008, it was announced that he would be retiring and would remain in the Devils' organization working for the team's alumni.

Personal life
Marshall sparked controversy in 1996 when he was charged for the sexual assault of a woman at a Winnipeg house party alongside Stars teammate Todd Harvey and two other men who were not NHL players. All four men were charged and released.

Career statistics

Awards
 1999 Stanley Cup Champion
 2003 Stanley Cup Champion

References

External links

1973 births
Living people
Battle of the Blades participants
Canadian ice hockey right wingers
Columbus Blue Jackets players
Dallas Stars players
Sportspeople from Mississauga
Lowell Devils players
National Hockey League first-round draft picks
New Jersey Devils players
Newmarket Royals players
Ottawa 67's players
St. John's Maple Leafs players
Stanley Cup champions
Toronto Maple Leafs draft picks
Ice hockey people from Ontario